BSC Artur Music is a professional beach soccer team based in Kyiv, Ukraine. The club sponsor is the music label Artur Music.

2020 Euro Winners Cup squad

Coach: Mykyta Shkliaruk

Honours

National competitions
Ukrainian Beach Soccer Premier League
 Winners (1): 2013
 Runners-up (1): 2016

European competitions
Euro Winners Cup'
 Runners-up (2): 2016, 2017

References

Ukrainian beach soccer clubs
Sport in Kyiv